Real Life with Sharon Caddy is a half-hour entertainment and lifestyle show on the Yes TV in Canada. It airs weekday afternoons at 3 p.m. ET, and is hosted by Sharon Caddy and Tanya Prokomenko. Real Life debuted on Yes TV (then Crossroads Television System) in January 2007.

Details
Sharon Caddy signed on to Crossroads Television System (CTS) to host and produce the show after spending nine years working as a weather anchor for CFTO-TV, CTV NewsNet and Canada AM. Joining Caddy as co-host and producer was Tanya Prokomenko, who stepped into the role from her post as promotions assistant and host of Entertainment Extra on CTS.

Real Life is a half hour, family friendly, lifestyle and entertainment program. Guests have included Glen Peloso (Restaurant Makeover), Elizabeth Baird (Canadian Living), Mark Cullen, Ricardo (Ricardo and Friends), Anthony Sedlak, Christine Cushing, Garry Marshall, Hal Linden, Erica Ehm, Mike Chalut (Kim's Rude Awakening), Trisha Romance, Michael W. Smith and many others.

Real Life also does travel features, highlighting family travel destinations. The Real Life team has travelled to Ottawa, Seattle, Virginia Beach, The Bahamas and Israel.

In January 2009, Real Life was also added to the lineup of The Accessible Channel.

External links
 Official Real Life website
 CTS Television website

Yes TV original programming
2007 Canadian television series debuts
2000s Canadian television talk shows